The 2007 FIBA Under-21 World Championship for Women was the second edition of the basketball world championship for U21 women's teams. It was played in Moscow Oblast, Russia, from 29 June to 8 July 2007. United States women's national under-21 basketball team won the tournament and became the world champions for the second time.

Qualified teams

First round
In the first round, the teams were drawn into two groups of six. The first four teams from each group advance to the quarterfinals, the other teams will play in the 9th–12th place playoffs.

Group A

Group B

9th–12th place playoffs

9th–12th place semifinals

11th place match

9th place match

Championship playoffs

Quarterfinals

5th–8th place playoffs

Semifinals

7th place match

5th place match

3rd place match

Final

Final standings

References

FIBA
International basketball competitions hosted by Russia
Basketball in Russia
2007 in Russian sport
FIBA
FIBA
2007 in Russian women's sport